Good References is a 1920 American silent romantic comedy drama film directed by Roy William Neill and starring Constance Talmadge, Vincent Coleman, Ned Sparks, Nellie Parker Spaulding, Mona Lisa, and Matthew Betz. It is based on the novel of the same name by E.J. Rath. The film was released by First National Exhibitors' Circuit in August 1920.

Cast
Constance Talmadge as Mary Wayne
Vincent Coleman as William Marshall
Ned Sparks as Peter Stearns
Nellie Parker Spaulding as Caroline Marshall (credited as Nellie P. Spaulding)
Mona Lisa as Nell Norcross (credited as Mona Liza)
Matthew Betz as Kid Whaley (credited as Matthew L. Betts)
Arnold Lucy as The Bishop
Dorothy Walters as the landlady
George Fawcett as Major Colton

Preservation
A copy of Good References survives at Národní Filmový Archiv in Prague.

References

External links

1920s romantic comedy-drama films
American romantic comedy-drama films
1920 films
American silent feature films
American black-and-white films
First National Pictures films
Films based on American novels
1920 comedy films
1920 drama films
Films directed by Roy William Neill
1920s American films
1920s English-language films
Silent romantic comedy-drama films
Silent American comedy-drama films